The arrondissement of Avesnes-sur-Helpe is an arrondissement of France in the Nord department in the Hauts-de-France region. It has 151 communes.

Composition

The communes of the arrondissement of Avesnes-sur-Helpe, and their INSEE codes, are:

 Aibes (59003)
 Amfroipret (59006)
 Anor (59012)
 Assevent (59021)
 Audignies (59031)
 Aulnoye-Aymeries (59033)
 Avesnelles (59035)
 Avesnes-sur-Helpe (59036)
 Bachant (59041)
 Baives (59045)
 Bas-Lieu (59050)
 Bavay (59053)
 Beaudignies (59057)
 Beaufort (59058)
 Beaurepaire-sur-Sambre (59061)
 Beaurieux (59062)
 Bellignies (59065)
 Bérelles (59066)
 Berlaimont (59068)
 Bermeries (59070)
 Bersillies (59072)
 Bettignies (59076)
 Bettrechies (59077)
 Beugnies (59078)
 Boulogne-sur-Helpe (59093)
 Bousies (59099)
 Bousignies-sur-Roc (59101)
 Boussières-sur-Sambre (59103)
 Boussois (59104)
 Bry (59116)
 Cartignies (59134)
 Cerfontaine (59142)
 Choisies (59147)
 Clairfayts (59148)
 Colleret (59151)
 Cousolre (59157)
 Croix-Caluyau (59164)
 Damousies (59169)
 Dimechaux (59174)
 Dimont (59175)
 Dompierre-sur-Helpe (59177)
 Dourlers (59181)
 Eccles (59186)
 Éclaibes (59187)
 Écuélin (59188)
 Élesmes (59190)
 Englefontaine (59194)
 Eppe-Sauvage (59198)
 Eth (59217)
 Étrœungt (59218)
 Le Favril (59223)
 Feignies (59225)
 Felleries (59226)
 Féron (59229)
 Ferrière-la-Grande (59230)
 Ferrière-la-Petite (59231)
 La Flamengrie (59232)
 Flaumont-Waudrechies (59233)
 Floursies (59240)
 Floyon (59241)
 Fontaine-au-Bois (59242)
 Forest-en-Cambrésis (59246)
 Fourmies (59249)
 Frasnoy (59251)
 Ghissignies (59259)
 Glageon (59261)
 Gognies-Chaussée (59264)
 Gommegnies (59265)
 Grand-Fayt (59270)
 Gussignies (59277)
 Hargnies (59283)
 Haut-Lieu (59290)
 Hautmont (59291)
 Hecq (59296)
 Hestrud (59306)
 Hon-Hergies (59310)
 Houdain-lez-Bavay (59315)
 Jenlain (59323)
 Jeumont (59324)
 Jolimetz (59325)
 Landrecies (59331)
 Larouillies (59333)
 Leval (59344)
 Lez-Fontaine (59342)
 Liessies (59347)
 Limont-Fontaine (59351)
 Locquignol (59353)
 La Longueville (59357)
 Louvignies-Quesnoy (59363)
 Louvroil (59365)
 Mairieux (59370)
 Marbaix (59374)
 Maresches (59381)
 Maroilles (59384)
 Marpent (59385)
 Maubeuge (59392)
 Mecquignies (59396)
 Monceau-Saint-Waast (59406)
 Moustier-en-Fagne (59420)
 Neuf-Mesnil (59424)
 Neuville-en-Avesnois (59425)
 Noyelles-sur-Sambre (59439)
 Obies (59441)
 Obrechies (59442)
 Ohain (59445)
 Orsinval (59451)
 Petit-Fayt (59461)
 Poix-du-Nord (59464)
 Pont-sur-Sambre (59467)
 Potelle (59468)
 Preux-au-Bois (59472)
 Preux-au-Sart (59473)
 Prisches (59474)
 Le Quesnoy (59481)
 Quiévelon (59483)
 Rainsars (59490)
 Ramousies (59493)
 Raucourt-au-Bois (59494)
 Recquignies (59495)
 Robersart (59503)
 Rousies (59514)
 Ruesnes (59518)
 Sains-du-Nord (59525)
 Saint-Aubin (59529)
 Saint-Hilaire-sur-Helpe (59534)
 Saint-Remy-Chaussée (59542)
 Saint-Remy-du-Nord (59543)
 Saint-Waast (59548)
 Salesches (59549)
 Sars-Poteries (59555)
 Sassegnies (59556)
 Sémeries (59562)
 Semousies (59563)
 Sepmeries (59565)
 Solre-le-Château (59572)
 Solrinnes (59573)
 Taisnières-en-Thiérache (59583)
 Taisnières-sur-Hon (59584)
 Trélon (59601)
 Vendegies-au-Bois (59607)
 Vieux-Mesnil (59617)
 Vieux-Reng (59618)
 Villereau (59619)
 Villers-Pol (59626)
 Villers-Sire-Nicole (59627)
 Wallers-en-Fagne (59633)
 Wargnies-le-Grand (59639)
 Wargnies-le-Petit (59640)
 Wattignies-la-Victoire (59649)
 Wignehies (59659)
 Willies (59661)

History

The arrondissement of Avesnes-sur-Helpe was created in 1800.

As a result of the reorganisation of the cantons of France which came into effect in 2015, the borders of the cantons are no longer related to the borders of the arrondissements. The cantons of the arrondissement of Avesnes-sur-Helpe were, as of January 2015:

 Avesnes-sur-Helpe-Nord
 Avesnes-sur-Helpe-Sud
 Bavay
 Berlaimont
 Hautmont
 Landrecies
 Maubeuge-Nord
 Maubeuge-Sud
 Le Quesnoy-Est
 Le Quesnoy-Ouest
 Solre-le-Château
 Trélon

References

Avesnes-sur-Helpe
French Hainaut